Rugby in Spain may refer to:

Rugby union in Spain
Rugby league in Spain